Altobello de Averoldi (died 1 November 1531) was a Roman Catholic prelate who served as Bishop of Pula (1497–1531).

Biography
On 13 November 1497, Altobello de Averoldi was appointed by Pope Alexander VI as Bishop of Pula. On 6 May 1498, he was consecrated bishop. 
He served as Bishop of Pula until his death on 1 November 1531.

References

External links and additional sources
 (for Chronology of Bishops) 
 (for Chronology of Bishops) 

15th-century Italian Roman Catholic bishops
16th-century Italian Roman Catholic bishops
1531 deaths
Bishops appointed by Pope Alexander VI